The Surface Pro X is a 2-in-1 detachable tablet computer developed by Microsoft. It was developed alongside and was announced on 2 October 2019 alongside the Surface Pro 7 and Surface Laptop 3. Updated hardware was announced alongside Surface Laptop Go and Surface accessories on October 1, 2020 and September 22, 2021. The device starts at $899.99 USD / £849.99.

The Surface Pro X comes with a Microsoft SQ1 or SQ2 ARM processor, which the company claimed has three times the performance of an x86 MacBook Air, whilst also having a 13-hour battery life. This is due to the increased power efficiency of ARM processors compared to traditional x86 processors. Microsoft has previously used ARM processors in the discontinued Surface RT and Windows Phone devices.

Microsoft now offers a Wifi-only version of the device as announced at their Surface Event on September 22, 2021.

Configuration
The Surface Pro X starts at US$899.99 / £849.99 for the least expensive model with 8 GB RAM and 128 GB storage.

The device can be bought with either 8 GB or 16 GB RAM. Users can also choose between 128 GB, 256 GB and 512 GB of storage.

Hardware and design 
The Surface Pro X is the 7th addition to Surface Pro lineup alongside the Surface Pro 7. Microsoft markets the tablet as a "go-anywhere, do-anything PC". Microsoft claims the Surface Pro X's battery can last up to 13 hours of use.

Compared to the Surface Pro 6, the Surface Pro X is slimmer and has rounder edges featuring a matte black finish construction in platinum and black finish. The device contains 2 USB-C ports, an eSIM and a SIM card slot for LTE, a removable SSD, and the Surface Connect port for charging. There are no microSD card slot and headphone jack on the tablet, requiring its users to use dongles and USB-C or Bluetooth enabled headphones.

The device's screen is a 13-inch touchscreen display, with smaller bezels compared to other Surface Pro devices.

The device uses Microsoft SQ1 or SQ2 ARM processors co-developed by Qualcomm, based on the Snapdragon 8cx Gen 1 and Gen 2 processors respectively. A Qualcomm X24 LTE modem is also featured in the device for both processors.

Software 
The Surface Pro X comes pre-installed with an ARM-based version of Windows 10, which supports ARM32 and ARM64 UWP and desktop apps from the Microsoft Store or from other sources. x86 applications can be run through emulation, addressing a major issue of Windows RT. Emulation of x64 applications is an upcoming feature that is already available to Windows Insiders for testing. In addition, Hyper-V can be installed on ARM64 devices such as the Surface Pro X running the Pro or Enterprise editions of Windows 10.

Timeline

References 

Microsoft Surface
2-in-1 PCs